The biennial Charlotte mayoral election was held on November 6, 2007. Mayor Pat McCrory, a Republican, was re-elected to a seventh term.

Hot button issues
Light rail: was a source of controversy.
Potential fallout over Charlotte Bobcats Arena: Arena bonds were voted down in 2002 but were later pushed through without voters' permission. This may have cost Republican city councilwoman Lynn Wheeler, a close McCrory ally, her job.
Growth: Charlotte is one of the fastest-growing cities in the United States. Around 32 people move to Charlotte every day and the city has found it hard to keep up in areas such as education.
Drunk driving: Charlotte saw a rash of drunk driving incidents, many resulting in deaths, in 2006, leading many to wonder if tougher punishments should be meted out.

Candidates

Democrats
 Beverly Earle: Seven-term North Carolina State Representative.
 Andy Silver: hypnotherapist dropped out of the race after learning that Earle would run

Republicans
 Pat McCrory: Six-term incumbent
 Ken Gjertsen: Member of the Charlotte-Mecklenburg Schools Board of Education, Transit tax opponent

Primary Election Results

Democratic
Beverly Earle was unopposed and did not face a primary.

Republican

General Election Results

Footnotes

2007
Charlotte mayoral
Charlotte